Philaethria is a genus of New World butterflies of the subfamily Heliconiinae in the family Nymphalidae.

Species
The following is a list of species classified under Philaethria:
Philaethria andrei Brevignon, 2002 - Found in Macouria, French Guiana
Philaethria constantinoi Salazar, 1991 - (incertae sedis) Found in the Chocó Department of western Colombia
Philaethria diatonica (Fruhstorfer, 1912) - Found in Central America and Mexico
Philaethria dido (Linnaeus, 1763) – scarce bamboo page, longwing dido, or green heliconia – The most widespread species of Philaethria. It can be found as far north as Mexico and Texas to as far south as the Amazon basin.
Philaethria ostara (Röber, 1906) - Found in the Cauca Department of western Colombia
Philaethria pygmalion (Fruhstorfer, 1912) - Found in the state of Pará, Brazil
Philaethria wernickei (Röber, 1906) - Found in the states of Santa Catarina and Rio Grande do Sul of Brazil

References

Philaethria, Tree of life

Heliconiini
Nymphalidae of South America
Nymphalidae genera
Taxa named by Gustaf Johan Billberg